Area code 712 is the telephone area code in the North American Numbering Plan (NANP) for the most western part of Iowa, including the cities of Spencer, Le Mars, Sioux City, Council Bluffs, Red Oak, Sheldon, Storm Lake, Carroll, Sac City, and Shenandoah.

Area code 712 was one of the original three area codes for the state of Iowa established in 1947, and is the only one that still has its original boundaries. It is one of the few remaining original area codes (not counting those covering an entire state) that has never been split or overlaid. Despite the proliferation of cell phones and pagers (particularly in Sioux City and Council Bluffs), it is projected to stay that way until at least 2031.

See also
 List of Iowa area codes

References

External links

712
712
Telecommunications-related introductions in 1947